Carlos Velarde (born 24 September 1990) is a Mexican professional boxer. He challenged for the WBA minimumweight title in 2013 and the WBO light flyweight title in 2014.

Professional career
On August 28, 2010 Velarde fought Jorle Estrada for the vacant WBC Youth Intercontinental minimumweight title.

References

External links

Living people
1990 births
Mexican male boxers
Mini-flyweight boxers
Boxers from Sinaloa
Sportspeople from Culiacán